Juan Carlos Ferrero defeated Nicolás Massú in the final, 6–3, 6–4, 6–3 to win the singles tennis title at the 2003 Madrid Open.

Andre Agassi was the reigning champion, but did not compete that year.

Seeds
A champion seed is indicated in bold text while text in italics indicates the round in which that seed was eliminated. All sixteen seeds received a bye into the second round.

  Juan Carlos Ferrero (champion)
  Andy Roddick (third round)
  Roger Federer (semifinals)
  Rainer Schüttler (second round)
  Carlos Moyà (third round)
  Sébastien Grosjean (quarterfinals)
  Paradorn Srichaphan (quarterfinals)
  Jiří Novák (third round)
  Mark Philippoussis (second round)
  Sjeng Schalken (second round)
  Martin Verkerk (second round)
  Agustín Calleri (second round)
  Gustavo Kuerten (second round)
  Tommy Robredo (second round)
  Younes El Aynaoui (semifinals)
  Félix Mantilla (third round)

Draw

Finals

Top half

Section 1

Section 2

Bottom half

Section 3

Section 4

References
 2003 Mutua Madrileña Masters Madrid Draw

Singles